The Schleicher Ka-2 Rhönschwalbe is a tandem two-seat training glider designed and built in Germany, in 1952.

Design and development
Designed by Rudolf Kaiser, the Ka-2 was an all wooden glider with plywood and aircraft fabric covering. The Ka-2s wings, with marked forward sweep and dihedral are mounted above the fuselage, flanking the rear cockpit. The front cockpit is covered by a one piece plexiglas canopy which opens to the right and the rear cockpit is covered by a canopy incorporating the inner leading edges of the wing, opening rear-wards, held in place by the front canopy when closed.

The undercarriage of the Ka-2 comprises a large rubber-sprung wooden skid under the forward fuselage in front of a non-retractable semi recessed mainwheel, as well as a steel rubber-sprung tail-skid. Conventional controls are fitted with ailerons on each wingtip trailing edge, elevator with anti-balance trim tab behind the tailplane and rudder aft of the fin. Schempp-Hirth airbrakes, at 38% chord and approx ⅓ span, open out above and below the wing to provide approach control.

Performance of the Ka-2 was found to be lower than expected, due to the relatively high wing loading.

Performance of the Ka-2b was improved in weak thermals due to a lower minimum sink speed, allowing tighter thermalling. Cross-country performance was also improved by a higher glide ratio, increasing the chance of reaching the next thermal. The standard competition handicap for the Ka–2 is 74 and the Ka-2b handicap is 78.

Operational history
The Ka-2 and Ka-2b saw extensive use in gliding clubs throughout Germany and Europe and the Ka2b was also used in several record attempts; On 24 January 1959 Dieter Schmitt and Karl Pummer climbed a Ka-2b  in lee wave lift at Fayence in France for a new German National two-seater record climb.

, flown by Uli Schwenk and his 81-year-old father.

Variants
Ka-2bAn improved performance version with  span wings and  fuselage.

Specifications (Ka-2)

See also

Notes

References

Further reading
Richard und Monique Ferrière: Les Planeurs et Motoplaneurs d' Alexander Schleicher 1951–1981. Motorbuch-Verlag, Stuttgart 1988, .

External links

French gliding website

Schleicher aircraft
1950s German sailplanes
High-wing aircraft
Aircraft first flown in 1953